The Los Angeles Public Library system (LAPL) is a public library system in Los Angeles, California. The system holds more than six million volumes, and with around 19 million residents in the Los Angeles Metropolitan area, it serves the largest population of any public library system in the United States. The system is overseen by a Board of Library Commissioners with five members appointed by the mayor of Los Angeles in staggered terms. In 1997 a local historian described it as "one of the biggest and best-regarded library systems in the nation."

History

The Los Angeles Library Association was formed in late 1872, and by early 1873, a well-stocked reading room had opened in the Downey Block at Temple and Main streets under the first librarian, John Littlefield.

The original library consisted of two rooms. The larger room was called the "Book Room," and the smaller room was called the "Conversation Room," which contained newspapers, tables, chairs, and spittoons for the chess and checkers players who gathered there.

Women were not initially involved in the conception and development of the Los Angeles Library Association. First Lady of California Maria Downey was given an honorary membership out of "courtesy," but otherwise, no women were listed in the association's founding documents, women were not represented on the board, and women were denied access to the library's reading room. However, this changed in 1876 when the association decided to implement a "Ladies Room." While this new room did not offer any books, it did provide a number of magazines and comfortable sofa and chairs for local clubwomen to use.

After Mary Foy was appointed as the first head woman librarian in 1880, her appointment was viewed as an act of charity by Mayor Toberman, who may have thought Foy to be in need of a job. Joanne Passet even posited that Foy's nomination, and librarian nominations in general, were seen as “an honorable means of assisting needy men and women in the community.” This notion was mostly confirmed when Foy was replaced by Jessie Gavitt, whose economic need was deemed greater than Foy's by the board. Following Foy's appointment, the LAPL would go on to be “headed by a series of women administrators” for the next 25 years. These administrators included, Mary E. Foy (1880-1884), Jessie Gavitt (1884-1889), Lydia Prescott (1889), Tessa Kelso (1889-1895), Clara Fowler (1895-1897), Harriet Child Wadleigh (1897-1900), and Mary L. Jones (1900-1905).

There was further speculation as to why the board decided on appointing Foy as the first head woman librarian. It may have been a political choice since she represented values that flourished in women's organizations, aiming to please the city's powerful women's clubs who may have been applying pressure. It's also suggested that Foy's nomination was a financial move; John Littlefield earned a salary of $100 while Mary Foy earned $75, which included janitorial work.

Tessa Kelso was appointed head librarian in 1889. She abolished the membership fee, increased membership from 100 to 20,000, increased the collection from 12,000 to 300,000 volumes, moved the books to open shelves, and permitted children to use the library. She set up an early system of branch libraries and moved the central library in to City Hall. She was forced out after a controversy over the library's acquisition of Jean Richepin's book La Cadet, which was considered indecent at the time.

Mary Jones, who was appointed Librarian in 1905, was fired by the library board in favor of Charles Fletcher Lummis. The only reason given for this was that the library should be run by a man, not a woman. This provoked "The Great Library War". Women in Los Angeles petitioned and marched in support of Jones but she was finally forced out; she took up a position as head of the library at Bryn Mawr College in Pennsylvania. Lummis established several special collections, including photography, autographs, and California and Spanish history. He oversaw two moves into larger buildings, and he greatly increased use of the library through several outreach programs.

Circa 1914, the collection numbered 203,600. The central library was located in the “Hamburger Building at Eighth and Broadway” with plans to soon move to the “Metropolitan Building at Fifth and Broadway.” The library had 22 branch “reading rooms” including two (San Pedro and Hollywood) housed in Carnegie library buildings. The library had a total of 41 “branches and distribution points” at that time, and cooperated with the “playground department” to offer “branch libraries” at “the Violet Street, Slauson, Hazard, and Echo Park playgrounds, and at the Recreation Center.”

Aggressive expansion and growth of the system began in the 1920s. The first building dedicated exclusively for library use opened in 1926.

City librarians

 1873–1879: John Littlefield
 1879–1880: Patrick Connolly
 1880–1884: Mary Foy
 1884–1889 : Jessie Gavitt
 1889–1889: Lydia Prescott
 1889–1895 : Tessa Kelso
 1895–1897: Clara Bell Fowler
 1897–1900: Harriet Child Wadleigh
 1900–1905: Mary Letitia Jones
 1905–1910: Charles Fletcher Lummis
 1910–1911: Purd Wright
 1911–1933: Everett Robbins Perry
 1933–1947: Althea Warren
 1947–1969: Harold Hamill
 1969–1990: Wyman Jones
 1990–1994: Elizabeth Martinez
 1995–2004: Susan Goldberg Kent
 2004–2008: Fontayne Holmes
 2009–2012: Martin Gomez
 2012–present: John Szabo

Central Library

The Central Library Goodhue building was constructed in 1926 and is a Downtown Los Angeles landmark. It was designed by architect Bertram Goodhue. This was his last work, because the man died suddenly in 1924. The Richard Riordan Central Library complex is the third largest public library in the United States in terms of book and periodical holdings. Originally named the Central Library, the building was first renamed in honor of the longtime president of the Board of Library Commissioners and President of the University of Southern California, Rufus B. von KleinSmid. The new wing of Central Library, completed in 1993, was named in honor of former mayor Tom Bradley.  The complex (i.e., the original Goodhue building and the Bradley wing) was subsequently renamed in 2001 for former Los Angeles Mayor Richard Riordan, as the Richard Riordan Central Library. The building was burned out by a catastrophic fire in 1986 when a million books and many other records (patents, play scripts, photographs) were damaged or totally destroyed. Arson was suspected but never proved.

Branches
Besides the Central Library in downtown Los Angeles, the system operates 72 branch locations in the city's neighborhoods. Eight of the larger branches are designated "regional branches."

High school diploma

The library offers an online program that allows adult patrons who have not completed high school to earn their high school diploma.

Special services
TESSA is Los Angeles Public Library online historical collections. TESSA is named after Tessa Kelso, Los Angeles City Librarian from 1889 to 1895.

In 2023, the library issued a limited-edition library card featuring the mountain lion P-22 in a National Geographic photo with the Hollywood Sign in the background.

See also

 List of Registered Historic Places in Los Angeles
 Samuel Bradford Caswell (1828–1898), one of the first trustees of the first Los Angeles public library, owned property where the Central Branch was built
 Donald D. Lorenzen, City Council member who supported renovation of library
 Althea Warren, head librarian, 1943–1947
Leontyne Butler King, first black member of the Los Angeles Library Commission (appointed 1961)
 Central Business District, Los Angeles (1880-1899)

References

External links

Official Los Angeles Public Library website
Los Angeles Public Library online Photo Collection: Photo Collection search engine.
Library Foundation of Los Angeles
SaveLAPL website opposing budget cuts impacting L.A. libraries
Fodors.com— L.A. Central Library
Consider The Library op-ed from LAist
Image of the Los Angeles Public Library's Central Library under construction, Los Angeles, approx 1925. Los Angeles Times Photographic Archive (Collection 1429). UCLA Library Special Collections, Charles E. Young Research Library, University of California, Los Angeles.

 
Culture of Los Angeles
Education in Los Angeles
Photo archives in the United States
Carnegie libraries in California
Government of Los Angeles